Trevor Gordon Bannister (14 August 193414 April 2011) was an English actor best known for having played the womanising junior salesman Mr Lucas in the sitcom Are You Being Served? from 1972 to 1979, and for his role as Toby Mulberry Smith in the long-running sitcom Last of the Summer Wine, from 2003 until it ended its run in 2010.

Career
In 1960, Bannister appeared on stage at the Cambridge Theatre in London in Billy Liar, which starred Albert Finney. He starred as Darkie Pilbeam, a wartime spiv, in the 1968 television series The War of Darkie Pilbeam; from 1969 to 1970, he appeared as "Heavy Breathing" in Jack Rosenthal's sitcom, The Dustbinmen. Shortly afterwards, he was asked to play Mr. Lucas in a Comedy Playhouse pilot called Are You Being Served? and took the part in the series. It was originally intended as a vehicle for him as the average man caught up in the store full of odd characters and baroque customs and, for the first four series, he received top billing every other episode, alternating with Mollie Sugden. However, as it developed into more of an ensemble piece, he found his role (and his billing) being greatly reduced as other characters came to the top. He left the role in 1980, as filming for the show clashed with a lengthy tour for a play.

In 1972, he appeared as the weak-bladdered producer of a local theatre company in Steptoe and Son, Episode 2 series 7 – "A Star is Born". He played Peter Pitt in the 1988 BBC sitcom Wyatt's Watchdogs. Other TV appearances include Keeping Up Appearances as the kitchen salesman, and also appeared in Call Earnshaw, Gideon's Way, The Saint, The Tomorrow People, Only on Sunday and The Avengers. Bannister played three different characters in the ITV soap Coronation Street. From 2001, he played a recurring character (The Golf Captain) in Last of the Summer Wine. He became a series regular in 2009, coinciding with the 30th series. Finally receiving a name ("Toby Mulbery-Smith"), he moved next door to Barry and Glenda (Mike Grady and Sarah Thomas), and befriended Morton (Christopher Beeny).

Although Bannister appeared in a few films including Reach for the Sky (1956), Au Pair Girls (1972) and the film version of Are You Being Served? (1977), he worked mostly in the theatre, with credits including Billy Liar and the farce Move Over, Mrs Markham. Bannister also performed in Shakespeare and was a regular in pantomime for more than 35 years, nearly always playing the dame. In 2007, he guest starred in the Doctor Who audio adventure, Nocturne.

His final appearance was in the TV series New Tricks episode "Old Fossils" broadcast 4 July 2011.

Personal life and death
Bannister was the youngest of three siblings. His first marriage was to actress Kathleen Cravos in 1959. They had three sons together and later divorced. He married Pamela Carson in 1982.

Bannister died on 14 April 2011, aged 76, after a heart attack at his allotment in Thames Ditton, Surrey. Are You Being Served? and Last of the Summer Wine co-star Frank Thornton said that the last event Bannister attended was Thornton's 90th birthday on 15 January 2011, three months before Bannister died.

Acting credits

Film

Television

Theatre

References

External links

Trevor Bannister at the British Film Institute
Obituary in The Telegraph

1934 births
2011 deaths
English male film actors
English male stage actors
English male television actors
Male actors from Wiltshire
Pantomime dames
20th-century English male actors
21st-century English male actors
British male comedy actors